Deseo (Desire) is the eleventh studio album by Mexican recording artist Paulina Rubio, released on  September 14, 2018 through Universal Music Spain, seven years after its predecessor Brava! (2011). Rubio worked with a multitude of producers and artist on the album, including Mauricio Rengifo, Andrés Torres, Juan Magán, The Julca Brothers, Toy "Selectah" Hernández, Morat, Joey Montana, Nacho, Xabier San Martin from La Oreja de Van Gogh, Alexis & Fido and DCS. It is a pop album characterized by Latin rhythms abound with urban sounds, and lyrical themes of love and female empowerment.

Five singles preceded the albums launch and were released within the span of three years starting in 2015 with "Mi Nuevo Vicio" featuring Colombian band Morat, following in 2016 with the second and third singles, "Si Te Vas" and "Me Quema", and concluding in 2018 with the fourth and fifth singles "Desire (Me Tienes Loquita)" featuring Nacho and "Suave y Sutil". The album peaked at number eighteen in the Promusicae album charts. and number thirteen in Billboard Latin Pop Albums. The album was certified gold in Chile.

Background and development
Since 2012—in full promotion of her final studio album with long-term, entitled Bravísima! which was a re-packaging of the singer's original studio album a year prior— Paulina Rubio was coach in different versions of the competition television series La Voz and joined the panel of third and final season of the American music competition television show The X Factor, where she replaced Britney Spears. At the end of 2013 Universal Music released Rubio's first compilation album entitled Pau Factor, containing the most successful songs of the artist of her six studio albums under the record label.

Rubio first teased a new single on Valentine's Day in 2014, playing a "La Bomba"-esque song "Cuanto Te Quiero" with producers in the studio. Even though she performed it live several times, the song's release as the album lead single was cancelled for unknown reasons.

A new single was released in January 2015, "Mi Nuevo Vicio", featuring Colombian group Morat, which was speculated would be the first single from Rubio's eleventh studio album. The song was a success in Spain and Latin America, specially in the first territorie, where reached number one Physical/Digital Songs, but the singer did not reveal the release of a new album. In a March 2020 interview with EFE, Rubio discussed that in these time she worked "more as a producer, businesswoman, and, above all, as a mentor [in differents music competition television show]."

In December 2016, she confirmed that the new album will feature contributions by DJ Snake and Selena Gomez, stating: "My new album is like another member of the team, or the family. It will be a true warrior, has something from all genres, from banda to pop, collaborations with DJ Snake and Selena Gomez. I tried to keep a key element: that the music is danceable". Gomez representatives later denied that she worked with Rubio.

Rubio then continued to release multiple singles "Si Te Vas (Paulina Rubio song)", "Me Quema" and "Desire (Me Tienes Loquita)" before finally revealing the title and release date of her new album, Deseo, announcing it will be released on September 14, 2018, a week after the release of another single titled "Suave Y Sutil" and released on September 7, 2018. The song features a return to her pop sound being a departure from the reggaeton oriented singles that preceded. The single was produced by Andrés Torres and Mauricio Rengifo responsible for productions of Latin hits like "Despacito" and "Echame La Culpa" from Luis Fonsi.

Theme and artwork
Rubio explained that Deseo is about "a feeling that can resemble the way I am",  also defined the album as "the wick that lights any fire as the desire to improve yourself, to get away from something you don't like, to change your life [or] simply having the strength to achieve what you want." The album's artwork features Rubio is sitting, with bare legs and high heels, playing a guitar and on top, with big red letters the word: DESEO is read, which gives the album its title. The cover album was presented September 3, 2018 on singer social media.

Composition

Rubio commented that the content of Deseo "activate women's senses and capture who I am both on and off the stage"; the media call it an album where Rubio "empowered women". The album music genre is pop with a foray into reggaeton and "Latin rhythms abound with urban sounds." Lyrically, the record contains lyrics about "female empowerment", the love and the sexual desire.

Deseo opens with the lead single "Desire (Me Tienes Loquita)", a dance-pop EDM style and reggaeton hybrid song that include a collaboration with Venezuelan singer Nacho. "Suave Y Sutil" includes a different sound to the album's title track, a pop-rock song with a self-empowerment anthem, was described as a "practically a revision" of Rubio's mid-2000's hit "Ni Una Sola Palabra". "Me Quema" is a Latin pop style was noted for its tropical and caribeñan sound. The fourth track, "Late Mi Corazón", includes a featured with the Spanish producer and singer Juan Magán. Sonically, is a "party" song with urban and electro-dance influences. "Mi Nuevo Vicio" was deemed one of the album's highlights due to its production to acoustic guitars and Colombian rumba style. The song includes a collaboration with the Colombian pop band Morat.

"Hoy Eres Ayer" is a light pop-rock ballad characterized for its "melodic" strings and drums hooks. The seventh track "Cuánto Te Quiero" was noted for "La Bamba" sampler, featuring guitar riffs, a pop rhythm and a "futuristic marimba" bridge. Rubio's eldest son, Andrea Nicolás, participates in the choirs. "Entre La luna Y El Sol", cited the Mexican folk story of sun and moon love, is a ranchera track with reggae arrangements. "Bajo La Luna", one of the album's best tracks for utilizing her previous experimentation of gypsy style and flamenco music with a pop music, is a joy love song.  The close album track, "Si Te Vas", it was compared to the her 1990s work for its pop rock style.

Critical reception

Upon its release, critical reception of Deseo was sharply divided. According to several media, the album "maintains the same energy" of Rubio's music "but is not afraid to incorporate new contemporary sounds, especially from the urban genre." Odi O'Malley, writing from their website, listed the record as "a compilation: of its 10 songs, only 5 are new to the listener, and the rest are made up of singles released in the last three years". He favored the melodic pop-rock songs and "Mi Nuevo Vicio" as the album's best tracks, but also said, "Rubio try to catch up with trend music, use more urban bases, trying to include elements of dancehall or EDM to some tracks, although she did not come out well in any of them."

Promotion

Singles
Throughout 2015 and 2016, Rubio released three solo songs, originally intended to be lead single from the album. "Mi Nuevo Vicio", released on January 27, 2015, features Colombian band Morat. It reached number one in Mexico and was certified gold, while in Spain reach number two on generally charts and number one on digital song sales chart. It additionally attained a double platinum certification for sales of 80,000 copies. "Si Te Vas" and a "Reggaeton Version" featuring Alexis & Fido, was released on January 22, 2016. The song landed top ten on Billboard Mexico Pop Español Airplay. "Me Quema", released on November 11, 2016, and reached number twenty-two in Mexico pop charts.

"Desire (Me Tienes Loquita)" featuring Venezuelan singer Nacho was released on May 25, 2018 as the album's lead single. It reached at number fourth in Ecuador charts. On September 7, 2018, was released as the album's second single "Suave Y Sutil". The song received praised from music critics, and accompanning a music video that "represents female empowerment" through a Victorian era-style video.

"Ya No Me Engañas" was released as the first single from the album's deluxe edition, Deseo Edicion Especial on April 3, 2019. It was written by Xabi San Martin and produced by hit-makers Andres Torres and Mauricio Rengifo.

Tour
Rubio began her fourth world tour Deseo Tour in support of the album on 9 June 2019 in Santiago, Chile at the Gran Arena Monticiello, where hit a sold out. Paulina took part of a concert organized by La Voz in the WiZink Center in Madrid, Spain on June 8, 2019. She was accompanied by the other three coaches, Luis Fonsi, Antonio Orozco and Pablo Lopez; the coacher's advisors, David Bustamante, Karol G, Antonio Jose and Miriam Rodriguez; and the contestants, Andres Martin, Maria Espinosa, Javi Moya and Angel Cortes. David Bisbal and Helena Bianco (winner of La Voz Senior) were invited to the concert. She was also the first pop artist to perform in Monterrey's Showcenter Complex in Monterrey, Mexico, on June 22, 2019. She is also set to perform in San Jose, CA on September 12, 2019, also hitting New York, Los Angeles, Chicago, Houston, among others, before concluding in Washington, DC on September 29, 2019.

Chart performance
The album peaked at #18 in the Spanish Promusicae album charts and #13 in the US Billboard Latin Pop Albums. The album eventually was certified gold in Chile.

Reissue
Rubio released a deluxe edition of the album titled Deseo Edicion Especial. It included four new songs, in addition to the original tracklist of the album. "Ya No Me Engañas" was released in April, 2019, as the first single from the special edition.

Track listing

Edición Especial

Samples
 "Cuánto Te Quiero" contains elements from Mexican folk song "La Bamba".

Charts

Certifications

References

2018 albums
Paulina Rubio albums
Spanish-language albums
Universal Music Latino albums